Summers v. Earth Island Institute, 555 U.S. 488 (2009), was a United States Supreme Court case decided 5–4 in which several environmental organizations, including Earth Island Institute, brought suit against the United States Forest Service (USFS) to enjoin that federal agency from implementing rules that would allow the salvage sale of timber from 238 acres of fire-damaged federally owned land without conducting the notice, comment, and appeal process of the Forest Service Decision-making and Appeals Reform Act.

While the environmental organizations were litigating the injunction in the lower courts, the parties reached a settlement regarding the 238 acres in question and the district court accordingly dismissed. The plaintiffs, however, maintained that they still had standing to challenge the constitutionality of the exemption process generally because the process was statistically certain to implicate their rights in the future.  The Court decided that this argument failed because, after voluntarily settling the portion of their lawsuit relevant to Burnt Ridge, respondents and their members are no longer under threat of injury from that project.  The Court decided against the plaintiffs, holding that the "deprivation of a procedural right without some concrete interest that is affected by the deprivation . . . is insufficient to create Article III standing."

References

External links
 

United States Supreme Court cases
United States Supreme Court cases of the Roberts Court
2009 in the environment
2009 in United States case law
United States environmental case law